Emmanuel "Manny" Davidson is a British property billionaire resident in Monaco but with significant holdings in the United Kingdom.

Davidson grew up in a terraced house in Blackpool during World War II. Prior to moving to Monaco, Davidson and his family lived in Lyresgrove, a Jacobean mansion house in Gloucestershire.

He is a former board member of Bowel & Cancer Research, but stepped down in 2010 to become its first patron.

In 2017, Davidson and his wife were involved in a legal dispute with their two children, Maxine and Gerald, over the return of a collection of jewellery, paintings and art thought to be worth more than £17 million.

References 

  

British billionaires
Living people
British expatriates in Monaco
Year of birth missing (living people)